Jorge Fellipe de Oliveira Figueiro (born 27 October 1988) is a Brazilian professional footballer who plays as a defender.

Career
Jorge Fellipe started his career with Juventude in Brazil where he made his professional debut in 2009.

In June 2016, Jorge Fellipe signed for Atlético Paranaense.

After winning the Serie C third division with CSA Fellipe most notable move was to Portugal to play for CD Aves in the Primeira Liga.

While at CD Aves he was part of the squad when they won the Portuguese Cup for the first time coming on in the 90th minute to help claim the honour. He left Aves at the end of the 2018–19 season.

In January 2020, Jorge Fellipe signed for Farense in the second tier of Portuguese football.

Fellipe in an interview with Lion City Sailors said "The Portuguese league is one of the most well-known leagues in Europe with many players who I used to watch only on TV, so my experience there was really important for my growth as a person and a player."

Jorge Fellipe joined Lion City Sailors in Singapore in 2021. He was a key player in the Sailors' championship win and was one of two of the team's players nominated for the league player of the year award.

In early 2022, Jorge Fellipe signed for Portuguese second-tier team Académica de Coimbra, citing a desire to help the club return to the top tier.

Career statistics

Honours
Centro Sportivo Alagoano
 Third-division (Serie C): 2017

Aves
Taça de Portugal: 2017–18

Lion City Sailors
Singapore Premier League: 2021

References

External links
 

1988 births
Living people
Brazilian footballers
Brazilian expatriate footballers
FC Volyn Lutsk players
Esporte Clube Juventude players
Figueirense FC players
Clube Náutico Capibaribe players
Paysandu Sport Club players
Duque de Caxias Futebol Clube players
América Futebol Clube (RN) players
Boavista Sport Club players
Madureira Esporte Clube players
Club Athletico Paranaense players
Centro Sportivo Alagoano players
C.D. Aves players
Damac FC players
S.C. Farense players
Al-Tai FC players
Campeonato Brasileiro Série A players
Campeonato Brasileiro Série B players
Campeonato Brasileiro Série C players
Campeonato Brasileiro Série D players
Primeira Liga players
Saudi Professional League players
Saudi First Division League players
Expatriate footballers in Ukraine
Expatriate footballers in Portugal
Expatriate footballers in Saudi Arabia
Brazilian expatriate sportspeople in Ukraine
Brazilian expatriate sportspeople in Portugal
Brazilian expatriate sportspeople in Saudi Arabia
Association football defenders